The 1987 Philippine Basketball Association (PBA) All-Filipino Conference was the second conference of the 1987 PBA season. It started on July 12 and ended on September 8, 1987. The tournament is an All-Filipino format, which doesn't require an import or a pure-foreign player for each team.

Format
The following format will be observed for the duration of the conference:
The teams were divided into 2 groups.

Group A:
Hills Bros. Coffee Kings
Magnolia Ice Cream Makers
Tanduay Rhum Makers

Group B:
Formula Shell Spark Aiders
Ginebra San Miguel
Great Taste Coffee Makers

Teams in a group will play against each other once and against teams in the other group twice; 8 games per team; Teams are then seeded by basis on win–loss records. Ties are broken among point differentials of the tied teams. Standings will be determined in one league table; teams do not qualify by basis of groupings.
The team with the worst record will be eliminated after the elimination round. 
Semifinals will be two round robin affairs with the remaining five teams.
The top two teams in the semifinals advance to the best of five Finals. The last two teams dispute the third-place trophy in a best of five playoff and the right to the last slot allocated for the IBA-PBA tournament.

Elimination round

Semifinals

Third place playoffs

Finals

References

PBA Philippine Cup
All-Filipino Conference